Timothy Gower Shaw (born 5 July 1959) is a former South African cricketer who played nine One Day Internationals between 1991 and 1994. He was also involved in the test series against England in England in 1994.

References
 

1959 births
Living people
Eastern Province cricketers
South African cricketers
South Africa One Day International cricketers
Alumni of Maritzburg College
People from Empangeni